Glenn Coleman (born 3 February 1961) is a former Australian rules footballer who played with Fitzroy, Sydney and Footscray in the VFL/AFL.

Coleman first played with Fitzroy and made his league debut in 1980. After five seasons with the Lions he moved to Sydney and finished second in their goalkicking with 32 goals in 1988. He represented New South Wales during this time, at interstate football. In 1990 he returned to Victoria and joined Footscray with whom he finished his career.

His son, Jackson, represented Australia at the under-19 Cricket World Cup and has played in the Victorian Football League for Sandringham and Frankston.

References

External links

1961 births
Living people
Fitzroy Football Club players
Sydney Swans players
Western Bulldogs players
New South Wales Australian rules football State of Origin players
Australian rules footballers from New South Wales